Metanarsia dahurica is a moth of the family Gelechiidae. It is found in Russia and Mongolia. The habitat consists of steppes.

The length of the forewings is 9–11 mm. The forewings are bright reddish-brown and the hindwings are light grey. Adults are on wing in June.

Etymology
The species name refers to the type region, the Dahurian steppes.

References

Moths described in 2005
Metanarsia